Dušan Bocevski (born 5 November 1973) is a former Macedonian professional basketball player. He was also a member of the Macedonia national team.

Achievements
KK Rabotnički
Macedonian First League : 1993-1994, 1994-1995, 1995-1996, 1996-1997
Macedonian Basketball Cup: 1994
Anwil Włocławek
Polish Basketball League: 2002-2003
KK Olimpija
Premier A Slovenian Basketball League: 2004-2005
Slovenian Basketball Cup: 2005

National team career
Dušan Bocevski was a member of the Macedonia national team that represented the country at the EuroBasket 1999.

References

1973 births
Living people
Cholet Basket players
Hapoel Holon players
KK Olimpija players
KK Rabotnički players
KK Włocławek players
KK Zadar players
Macedonian men's basketball players
Sportspeople from Skopje
Centers (basketball)